Signalis (stylized as SIGNALIS) is a survival horror video game developed by rose-engine and published by Humble Games and Playism on October 27, 2022.

Gameplay
The core gameplay consists of third-person shooter elements from a top-down 2.5D perspective, with occasional puzzle elements. Puzzles vary from manipulating switches and dials, to searching for certain frequencies to broadcast in Elster's radio implant. 

Difficulty and thematic elements are enhanced through the use of resource management as a gameplay and narrative mechanic. Elster is limited to six items on her person, including weapons, ammunition and key items for use in puzzle-solving and unlocking doors. In the fashion of Resident Evil, another survival horror series, there are safe rooms that allow the player to save progress and store their items for future use.

Synopsis

Setting
Signalis takes place during an era with space travel and advanced technology, in an unidentified planetary system that is governed by the totalitarian Nation of Eusan, which remains at war with a larger Empire that it broke away from. The political and economic center of Eusan is the Rotfront colony, but it maintains outposts on other nearby worlds. Eusan employs Replikas, androids made with copied human neural imprints, as the bulk of its military and labor force. A consequence of using neural imprints is that Replikas inherit various idiosyncrasies from them, such as a compulsive desire to listen to music or bathe, and failure to indulge these idiosyncrasies can cause a Replika to destabilize and cease functioning. Human commanders called Gestalts manage and give direction to Replikas.

Plot
A scout shuttle known as the Penrose-512 crashes on an unknown planet. A Replika unit known as Elster (LSTR) awakens and searches for her missing Gestalt partner, Ariane. She eventually leaves the ship and crosses a rectangular arch, finding herself in front of a hole containing a staircase. After she descends and crawls into a tight tunnel leading into a room, the hole closes behind her. As she picks up The King in Yellow, the radio turns on and a German numbers station is read out, while "Great holes secretly are digged where Earth’s pores ought to suffice, and things have learnt to walk that ought to crawl." from H.P. Lovecraft's The Festival plays. The broadcast ends on visions of Ariane asking Elster to "Remember our promise" and "wake up". 

Elster then finds herself in the Sierpinski-23 mining facility, located on the planet Leng with a photograph of a woman resembling Ariane named Alina Seo. She quickly discovers that most of the Gestalt staff are dead and the Replika workforce has gone rogue, having turned into mindless beings that attack her on sight. Elster explores the facility, gathering supplies and looking for clues about what happened and Alina's location. She opens a box belonging to Alina Seo and  encounters a "red plate, that is warm to the touch", before being transported to Ariane's radio station and receiving a transmitter module. She then encounters the facility's Replika administrator, Adler. After a brief interaction, he pushes her down an elevator shaft after telling her "You shouldn't have returned.". Elster lands on dozens of bodies from other LSTRs, surviving the fall.

Continuing her search, she finds Adler's diary, discovering he recollects memories he never lived - which he believes originated from other realities. Elster delves deeper into the mines below the facility, finding the lowest levels to consist of a gigantic mass of flesh before entering through an identical rectangular arch. Adler despairs about the fate of Falke, the commander of the facility, who changed when she returned from beyond the arch, never explaining what she saw. Elster crosses the threshold and finds the Penrose, but tears her own arm off attempting to open the airlock and subsequently passes out, with other LSTR bodies being seen.

While unconscious, Elster dreams of Ariane, portraying a happy memory between the two in which they end up dancing after embracing each other. Afterwards, Ariane is portrayed standing above Elster, asking her if she remembers their promise. Elster regains consciousness and manages to reenter the Penrose, scavenging parts from another dead LSTR unit to repair herself. She then jumps down a hole that has appeared in the ship, finding herself back in Sierpinski-23, though the environment has become inundated with masses of flesh. Making her way through the facility again, Elster drops down another hole and finds herself on the colonized moon of Rotfront. There, she learns that Ariane was relentlessly bullied by her classmates, signing up for the Penrose program to escape her torment. Elster continues on as the environment becomes more surreal, finally encountering Falke. Various collected notes reveal that Falke inherited Elster's memories and now has a crisis of identity, leading her to attack. 

Elster defeats Falke, as flashbacks of both Elster's and Falke's memories are shown. Elster then returns to the threshold where Adler waits for her, warning Elster that no matter what she does, once she crosses the threshold time will loop again, and reality will fall apart with it shattering at any time. Elster continues regardless and a scuffle ensues, both Replikas being mortally wounded — with Adler being shot and Elster stabbed in the eye. Elster continues on, returning to the wreckage of the Penrose, where it is revealed that if the scout pilots failed to find a habitable planet, they were not expected to return home. Eventually, the radiation shielding failed and Ariane was diagnosed with acute radiation poisoning.

Depending on the player's actions throughout the game, four endings are possible:
 To acquire the "Leave" ending, the player must be conservative with ammunition, heal frequently, and spend a long time exploring. In this ending, Elster cannot work up the courage to see Ariane again and carry out their promise, instead leaving the ship to succumb to her wounds in the wasteland outside.
 To get the "Memory" ending, the player must utilize a balanced playstyle. Elster awakens Ariane, but she doesn't remember who Elster is nor their promise. Elster cannot follow through and stays by Ariane's side until she succumbs to her wounds.
 The "Promise" ending requires the player to play aggressively, killing numerous enemies, dealing a significant amount of damage, and spending a long time in-game. Elster awakens Ariane, who remembers her and asks her to keep their promise. Elster reluctantly follows through, killing Ariane before succumbing to her own wounds.
 In the secret "Artifact" ending, after acquiring three hidden keys throughout the game that unlocks Ariane's safe which yields a vase of white lilies, Elster performs an esoteric ritual that results in her apparent death. A memory of her and Ariane dancing can then be seen inside the wreckage of the Penrose-512. 

It is to be noted that a significant part of the plot is left up to the player's interpretation; while some theories are more accepted than others, there is no single consensus about the story.

Development
The game was developed by the two person German studio rose-engine, with development beginning in 2014. Additional help was brought on through external composers. The game was released across multiple platforms on October 27, 2022. Publishing was handled by Humble Games and Playism.

Aesthetically, the game pulls inspiration from the graphics of the fifth generation of video game consoles, particularly from the original PlayStation game console. The game includes a CRT mode to further mimic the effect. Additional aesthetic influence comes from more traditional artwork, incorporating The Shore of Oblivion by Eugen Bracht as well as Arnold Böcklin's Isle of the Dead into the game. Literary influences include The Festival by H. P. Lovecraft and The King in Yellow by Robert W. Chambers. Filmic works by Stanley Kubrick, Hideaki Anno and David Lynch helped shape the narrative's themes of identity and memory in the game. Developer rose-engine also acknowledged Tsutomu Nihei's works as an influence, as well as Gantz.

During the title screen of the game, the Number station "Three Note Oddity" can be heard.

Reception

Signalis has received "generally favorable" reviews on Metacritic on all available platforms.

Critics generally praised the atmosphere and environmental storytelling of the game, although limited inventory and combat received criticism.

Some reviewers offered praise of the overall game, while noting a specific aspect that they felt held it back. The Verge noted issues with a few puzzles, but praised the overall game. GameSpot noted that the aiming was "unreliable", while Nintendo Life instead critiqued that the boss fights of the game were not well suited to the combat system.

The game was included on Polygons list of the best games of 2022. Willa Rowe, in a review published by Inverse, referred to the game as the "best horror game of 2022".

Accolades

References

External links 

2022 video games
2020s horror video games
Dystopian video games
Indie video games
New York Game Award winners
Nintendo Switch games
Playism games
PlayStation 4 games
Retrofuturistic video games
Science fiction horror video games
Single-player video games
Survival horror video games
Top-down video games
Video games developed in Germany
Video games featuring female protagonists
Video games set in outer space
Video games set in the future
Video games with alternate endings
Windows games
Xbox One games